The discography of American rapper Big Scarr consists of one Studio album, one mixtape, six compilation albums, and seven singles.

Studio albums

Compilation albums

Mixtapes

Singles

Guest appearances

References

Discographies of American artists